Megastraea undosa, common name the wavy turban snail, is a species of sea snail, a marine gastropod mollusk in the family Turbinidae, the turban snails. This species is native to the coast of California.

Distribution
This species occurs in the eastern Pacific Ocean from California, USA to Central Baja California, Mexico.

Description 
One of the largest gastropod shells found on the Southern California coast, this species varies between 40 mm and 145 mm. The shell lacks an umbilicus, and has a turbinate-conical shape.   Like other shells of the family turbinidae it is composed of a thick inner nacreous layer, covered by a thinner porcellanous layer.  In this species both are covered by a dark brown shaggy periostracum in life.  The periphery of the shell forms a twisted ridge at the outer edge of each whorl. Each whorl also has regular, coarsely sculpted rows of fine knobs and folds. The base is marked with several spiral cords concentric to the arcuated columella which has a pearly groove.  The unusual operculum has four strong ridges on its outer side decorated with hard shelly bristles that radiate in a curvilinear fashion from its pointed edge.

Habitat 
This large snail inhabits rocky shores in shallow waters, generally protected areas below the low tide level.

References

 W.H. Dall (1910) New Species of West American Shells; The Nautilus v. 23, 1910

External links
 
 Alf A. & Kreipl K. (2011) The family Turbinidae. Subfamilies Turbininae Rafinesque, 1815 and Prisogasterinae Hickman & McLean, 1990. In: G.T. Poppe & K. Groh (eds), A Conchological Iconography. Hackenheim: Conchbooks. pp. 1–82, pls 104–245.
 Williams, S.T. (2007). Origins and diversification of Indo-West Pacific marine fauna: evolutionary history and biogeography of turban shells (Gastropoda, Turbinidae). Biological Journal of the Linnean Society, 2007, 92, 573–592.
 Proo, Sag del, Larval and early juvenile development of the wavy turban snail, Megastraea undosa (Wood, 1828) (Gastropoda : Turbinidae); The Veliger 46 (4), 2003

undosa
Gastropods described in 1828
Taxa named by William Wood (zoologist)